The 2013–14 Ligat Nashim was the 16th season of women's league football under the Israeli Football Association.

The league was won by ASA Tel Aviv University, its fifth consecutive title and sixth overall. By winning, ASA Tel Aviv qualified to 2014–15 UEFA Women's Champions League.

Maccabi Be'er Sheva finished bottom of the first division and was relegated to the second division, and was replaced by second division winner, Maccabi Tzur Shalom Bialik. The second-bottom club in the first division, Bnot Sakhnin met Bnot Netanya for a spot in Ligat Nashim Rishona, Bnot Sakhnin winning 7–0 to remain in the first division.

Ligat Nashim Rishona

Regular season

Championship group

Relegation group

Promotion/relegation play-off

Top scorers

Ligat Nashim Shniya

Format changes
As 7 teams registered to the second division, the participating clubs played a conventional double round-robin schedule for a total of 14 rounds, followed by one round-robin schedule, for a planned total of 18 matches for each club. As Bnot Caesarea Tiv’on withdrew from the competition mid-season, the schedule was shortened to 15 matches for each club.

League table

Bnot Caesarea Tiv'on withdrew from the league after 8 matches, and its results were annulled.

Top scorers

References
Ligat Nashim Rishona @IFA
Ligat Nashim Shniya @IFA

Ligat Nashim seasons
1
women
Israel